Vian may refer to:

Places
 Vian, Iran, a village in Hamadan Province, Iran
 Vian, Oklahoma, a town located in the United States
 Vian, Norway, a town located in Vestvågøy, Norway

People

Surname
 Boris Vian (1920–1959), French writer, poet, singer, and musician
 Dominique Vian (born 1944), French overseas civil servant
 Sir Philip Vian (1894–1968), admiral in the Royal Navy

Given name
 Vian Smith (1919–1969), author from Devon, United Kingdom, who wrote extensively about horses and the Moors
 Marshall Vian Summers (born 1949), American spiritual leader and author

Other
 Vian, a member of the fictional advanced alien species in the 1968 episode "The Empath" in the original Star Trek television series